Abano Terme (known as Abano Bagni until 1924) is a town and comune in the Province of Padua, in the Veneto region, Italy, on the eastern slope of the Euganean Hills; it is  southwest by rail from Padua. Abano Terme's population is 19,062 (2001) (in 1901 it was 4,556).

The town's hot springs and mud baths are an important economic resource.

History
The baths were known to the Romans as Aponi fons or Aquae Patavinae. A description of them is given in a letter to Theodoric, the king of the Ostrogoths, from Cassiodorus. Some remains of the ancient baths have been discovered (S. Mandruzzato, Trattato dei Bagni d'Abano, Padua, 1789).  An oracle of Geryon lay near, and the so-called sortes Praenestinae (C.I.L. i., Berlin, 1863; 1438–1454), small bronze cylinders inscribed, and used as oracles, were perhaps found here in the 16th century.

The baths were destroyed by the Lombards in the 6th century, but they were rebuilt and enlarged when Abano became an autonomous comune in the 12th century and, again, in the late 14th century. The city was under the Republic of Venice from 1405 to 1797.

Main sights
Abano Cathedral, or the cathedral (duomo) of St. Lawrence. The current edifice was erected in 1780 over a pre-existing church which was allegedly destroyed by Cangrande della Scala. The bell tower has parts from the 9th/10th and 14th centuries.
The Montirone Gallery, housing works of Il Moretto, Palma il Giovane, Guido Reni, Giovanni Domenico Tiepolo and others.
The Sanctuary of the Madonna della Salute or of Monteortone (built from 1428). It lies on the site where the Madonna appeared to Pietro Falco, healing his wounds. The church is on the Latin cross plan, with a nave and two aisles with three apses decorated by a frieze. It has with a Baroque portal (1667), a bell tower, presbytery frescoes portraying the Histories of St. Peter and Virgin by Jacopo da Montagnana (1495) and Palma il Giovane's altarpiece depicting Christ Crucifixed Between St. Augustine and St. Jerome.

Just outside the city is San Daniele Abbey (11th century).  from the city is also Praglia Abbey, founded in the 11th century by Benedictine monks and rebuilt in 1496–1550. The abbey church of the Assumption, with a marble portal from 1548, has a Renaissance style interior.

People
 Pietro d'Abano (1316), Italian physician and philosopher

Twin towns
 Shibukawa, Japan
 Bad Füssing, Germany
 Lipik, Croatia
 Kamena Vourla, Greece

See also 
 Ex Oratorio del Montirone

References

Sources
L'Italia da scoprire, Giorgio Mondadori, 2006.

External links

 Abano.it Touristic informations web site

Cities and towns in Veneto
Spa towns in Italy